Mansoura is a city in Egypt, with a population of 960,423. It is the capital of the Dakahlia Governorate.

Etymology 
Mansoura in Arabic means "victorious". The city is named after the El Mansoura Battle against Louis IX of France during the Seventh Crusade.

History
After the Egyptians defeated the Crusaders during the Seventh Crusade, it was named Mansoura (aka. "The Victorious").

In the Seventh Crusade, the Capetians were defeated and put to flight; between fifteen and thirty thousand of their men fell on the battlefield. Louis IX of France was captured in the main Battle of Fariskur, and confined in the house of Ibrahim Ibn Lokman, secretary of the sultan, and under the guard of the eunuch Sobih. The king's brother was imprisoned in the same house. The sultan provided for their sustenance. The house of Ibrahim Ibn Lokman is now the only museum in Mansoura. It is open to the public and houses articles that used to belong to the French monarch, including his personal thirteenth century toilet.

The Mansoura Air Battle on October 14, 1973, occurred during the Yom Kippur War. Israeli Air Force fighters attacking Egyptian air bases were intercepted by the Egyptian Air Force. On that day, 160 jet fighters, most belonging to Israel, battled for 53 minutes over Mansoura. The Egyptian army claimed that despite the numerical and qualitative superiority of the Israeli warplanes, 17 Israeli planes were downed. (2 according to the Israelis), while the rest retreated. Egypt announced the loss of six planes, only three of which fell to Israeli fire. The Egyptian government subsequently changed the country's "Air Force Day" from November 2 to October 14, to commemorate the Mansoura Air Battle.

Geography

Location
Mansoura lies on the east bank of the Damietta branch of the Nile, in the Delta region. Mansoura is about 120 km northeast of Cairo. Across from the city, on the opposite bank of the Nile, is the town of Talkha.

Climate

Köppen-Geiger climate classification system classifies its climate as hot desert (BWh).

Culture

The Egyptian Arabic dialect spoken by Mansoura's population is a northern Egyptian Arabic dialect, with noticeable influences from the city's surrounding rural villages, each of which has contributed to the city's population over the years. There are some similarities to Alexandrian Egyptian Arabic in some aspects of pronunciation.

Mansoura National Museum used to be Dar Ibn Lockman, the house where Louis IX was imprisoned in 1250 during the Seventh Crusade. Displayed in the museum are the suits of mail and swords of the crusaders, as well as a collection of maps. Huge paintings depict the Battle of Mansoura.

The Mansoura branch of the National Library was recently inaugurated as the Mansoura Misr Library.

Mansoura is famous for its architectural style, especially the Shinnawi Palace (after Mohamed Bek El-Shinnawi, a member of the Wafd Party). It was built by an Italian architect in 1928. The mosque of El-Saleh Ayoub El-Kebir is one of the most important in Mansoura. It was built by a loyal servant of the Sultan and is located in Al-Sagha Street that separates "Old Mansoura" from the modern city.

Like Cairo, Alexandria and Port Said, Mansoura was home to a flourishing Greek community until the Nasser era, when many were forced to leave. Many of the older and best established shops and businesses around the city still bear their original Greek names. Mansoura also had a small Italian population living in the city too. The first Old English school in the city was established on the site of the old Greek school in the Toriel area, one of the traditionally relatively affluent residential districts of the city.

Education

The University of Mansoura was founded in 1962, initially as a branch of Cairo University. The Urology and Nephrology center of Mansoura University founded by Prof Mohammed Ghonem is considered to be the best kidney center in the Middle East and Africa.

Mansoura has a sports stadium (Mansoura Stadium) which is home to its football team.

Clubs (Sport) 
 Gezert Elward Sport Club: It is located directly on the Nile and has tennis courts, swimming, gymnastics, squash and social club. Recently, the gymnastics team participated under the seven-year club in the Republic Championship and received 2 gold medals 13 silver and 1 bronze and 1 participation.
 Mansoura Sports Club: It has an official football field.
 Mansoura Sports Stadium: It has an official football field, swimming pool, social club and many sports facilities.
 The Olympic Village (Mansoura University Stadium): It covers an area of 15 acres and is open to university students, faculty members and those wishing to play abroad in individual and group games.
Nile Club: The club was established by decision of the University Council in its session held on 12/27/1993, provided that it has financial, administrative and technical resignation, and it is located in Rose Island in the lower walkway in Mansoura. The club is a cultural, social, sports and recreational center for faculty members, their assistants, and university staff.

Notable people
 Adel Emam; Egyptian actor.
Hassan El-Imam; Egyptian film director, titled Box-office King
 Mohamed Ghoneim Urologist.
 Anis Mansour; Egyptian writer.
 Gad al-Haq Ali Gad al-Haq; Grand Imam of Al-Azhar from 1982 to 1996; Public figure; Islamic scholar.
 Ibrahim Salah; Footballer.
 Muhammad Metwali Alsharawi; Public figure; Islamic scholar.
 Pope Tawadros II; Pope of Alexandria & Patriarch of All Africa on the Holy Apostolic See of Saint Mark the Evangelist of the Coptic Orthodox Church of Alexandria.
 Umm Kulthum; Singer, title Kawkab al-Sharq.
 Farouk El-Baz; Space Scientist.
Ahmed Hamdi
Hesham Sallam
Ahmed Eid; Egyptian actor.
Kareem Abu-Elmagd
Ahmed Hamed

See also

 List of cities and towns in Egypt
Central Library - Mansoura University

References

External links
 

 http://www.dakahliya.gov.eg/Dakhlya/PDF_Files_/Dr_Ayman.pdf

  Official website

 
Populated places in Dakahlia Governorate
Governorate capitals in Egypt
Cities in Egypt
Metropolitan areas of Egypt
Crusade places
1219 establishments
Medieval cities of Egypt
Populated places established in the 1210s
13th-century establishments in the Ayyubid Sultanate